Harshad Hanumant Gadekar (born 5 December 1986) is an Indian first-class cricketer who plays for Goa.

References

External links
 

1986 births
Living people
Indian cricketers
Goa cricketers
Cricketers from Goa